HTP may refer to:

Music
 Heitor Pereira, a composer professionally known as Heitor TP
 Hughes Turner Project, a British rock group
 HTP (album), their 2002 debut album
 "Hail to Pitt", a fight song of the University of Pittsburgh

Other uses
 Heated tobacco product
 High-test peroxide, a highly concentrated solution of hydrogen peroxide, used e.g. as a rocket propellant
 Hotep, regularly found in the names of ancient Egyptian figures
 5-hydroxytryptophan (abbreviated 5-HTP)
 HTP Winward Motorsport, a German auto racing team